Sir Reginald MacLeod of MacLeod  (1 February 1847 – 20 August 1935) was the 27th Chief of Clan MacLeod.

Life
 
Sir Reginald MacLeod of MacLeod was born on 1 February 1847. He was the son of Norman MacLeod of MacLeod (1812–1898), 25th Chief of Clan MacLeod, and his wife Louisa Barbara St. John (1818–1880), only daughter of the 14th Baron St John of Bletso. He was educated at Harrow and Cambridge.

On 17 April 1877, Sir Reginald  married Lady Agnes Mary Cecilia Northcote (d. 26 October 1921), the daughter of Sir Stafford Northcote, Chancellor of the Exchequer at the time and later 1st Earl of Iddesleigh, and Cecilia Frances Farrer. They had two daughters.

In the 1885 general election, he stood unsuccessfully for the Conservatives in Inverness-shire losing the seat to an Independent Liberal. In 1889, he became the Queen's and Lord Treasurer's Remembrancer, an office of the Court of the Exchequer which was originally concerned with the recovery of dues, penalties, and debts owed to the Crown. In February 1900, he was appointed the fourth Registrar General, and in this role he presided over the 1901 census. Two years later, in August 1902, he was appointed Permanent Under Secretary for Scotland. He was knighted in 1905. After a further unsuccessful attempt to be elected to Parliament in 1911 he retired from public life and became a director of Shell, the first of several directorships he held.

Sir Reginald became 27th Chief of Clan MacLeod in 1929 on the death of his elder brother Norman Magnus. Sir Reginald was the laird of the islands of St Kilda in 1930, when the last inhabitants left the islands. In 1931, he sold the islands to Lord Dumfries, later Marquess of Bute. The famous Fairy Flag of the MacLeod's was mounted by Sir Reginald. An expert from the Victoria and Albert Museum discussed with Sir Reginald the possible origins of the flag, avoiding reference to the supernatural. Sir Reginald listened and said, "You may believe that, but I know that it was given to my ancestor by the fairies."

Family 

His daughter Olive was noted for her journey of  into the heart of Africa in 1910–1911 to visit her fiancé's grave. The MacLeod waterfalls on the Moa Kabi river are named after her. She went on to marry Charles Lindsay Temple, who was later Lieutenant-Governor of Northern Nigeria.

Succession
Sir Reginald's elder brothers had both died without male issue and his younger brother's only son, Iain Breac, had been killed in the sinking of HMS Goliath in 1915. As there were no immediate male heirs, he was succeeded by his eldest daughter Dame Flora MacLeod of MacLeod (1878–1976), 28th Chief of MacLeod and the second female chief of the clan.

Ancestry

References

1847 births
1935 deaths
People educated at Harrow School
Alumni of the University of Cambridge
Reginald
Conservative Party (UK) parliamentary candidates
Knights Commander of the Order of the Bath
Registrars-General for England and Wales
MacLeod, Reginald MacLeod, 6th Lord